Frank Hogg may refer to:

 Frank Scott Hogg (1904–1951), Canadian astronomer
 Frank T. Hogg (1894–?), American football player